Manuel Carlos Mouriño Atanes (born 4 March 1943) is a Spanish businessman. He has been president of the football club RC Celta de Vigo since 2006.

After starting his career in his native Vigo and in Madrid, he emigrated to Mexico City in 1978 to operate his father-in-law's businesses. In 1985, he purchased a chain of petrol stations in Campeche, which expanded into other states. His assets diversified into construction and fast food franchising in the 1990s and 2000s. Politically, he endorsed the National Action Party (PAN), of which his son Juan Camilo (1971–2008) was a member.

Mouriño returned to Galicia in 2000, becoming a board member at Celta in 2003 and president in 2006. After being relegated and going through a financial crisis, the team won promotion back to La Liga in 2012 and he became their longest-serving president in 2017.

Biography

Early life and career
Born in Vigo, Galicia, Mouriño was educated by the Salesians. He worked for a local travel agency and as a car accessory salesperson before moving to Madrid, becoming head of administration at the Riomiño metalworks and director general of Nautrónica, an American transport and arms company.

Career in Mexico
Following Nautrónica's financial crisis, Mouriño emigrated to Mexico in 1978 to manage his father-in-laws assets in Mexico City, including hotels, furniture shops and bakeries. In the same year, he founded Ivancar, a car mat manufacturer; Iztapalapa, a paper recycler, followed in 1984. After two armed attacks on his hotels, and wishing to spend more time with his family, he bought a chain of five petrol stations in Campeche in 1985, buying the shares from his two business partners three years later.

In the late 1980s and early 1990s, Mouriño's business interests diversified into housing, as state governor  ordered new constructions. Mouriño lost 1 million Mexican pesos in the early 1990s after investing in Banco Unión. In 1997, he registered Grupo Energético del Sureste (GES), operating petrol stations in other southeastern states and since 2003 holding franchises for fast food such as Church's Chicken and Burger King.

Politically, Mouriño had strong relationships with Institutional Revolutionary Party (PRI) politicians such as Carrillo Zavala, but endorsed the National Action Party (PAN) in 1992. He campaigned for Vicente Fox in the 2000 Mexican general election. He stopped political activity after the rise of his son Juan Camilo Mouriño (1971–2008) in the PAN.

President of Celta
Mouriño returned to Galicia in 2000. He became a member of the board at RC Celta de Vigo in December 2003 and became president in May 2006 after buying the majority of shares possessed by predecessor Horacio Gómez. One of his earliest actions was replacing manager Fernando Vázquez with former FC Barcelona player Hristo Stoichkov, who had never been a head coach before; the team were relegated in 2006–07 and Stoichkov was dismissed early into the next campaign. 

In 2009, Celta narrowly avoided relegation to Segunda División B and entered bankruptcy proceedings over a €69 million debt. Mouriño reduced the debt by 85% and negotiated with the treasury, allowing for the bill to be reduced to €20 million to be paid by 2020. During the club's financial crisis, he received offers from investors who wished to relocate it to another city. 

In 2011–12, the team achieved promotion back to La Liga as runners-up. Mouriño surpassed Gómez's record in March 2017 as the longest-serving president of Celta. In November 2022, approaching his 80th birthday, he declared that he would remain in the presidency until at least the club's centenary in August.

References

1943 births
Living people
People from Vigo
Businesspeople from Galicia (Spain)
Spanish expatriates in Mexico
Spanish football chairmen and investors
RC Celta de Vigo non-playing staff